Capelliniosuchus is an extinct genus of mosasaur. It was discovered in Italy, and described by Simonelli, originally believing it to be a metriorhynchid crocodyliform similar to Dakosaurus. However, after re-examining the type specimen, Sirotti concluded that it was a junior synonym of Mosasaurus hoffmannii. A 2014 paper found the genus to be distinct from M. hoffmannii.

Capellineosuchus is a misspelling by Romer.

References

Mosasaurs

zh:卡普林鱷